The Anderson Hills are an irregular group of hills, ridges and peaks between Mackin Table and the Thomas Hills in the Patuxent Range, Pensacola Mountains, Antarctica. They were mapped by the United States Geological Survey from surveys and from U.S. Navy air photos, 1956–66. The hills were named by the Advisory Committee on Antarctic Names at the suggestion of Captain Finn Ronne, U.S. Navy Reserve, leader at Ellsworth Station, 1957. As Deputy Secretary of Defense, 1954–55, Robert B. Anderson had responsibilities for U.S. operations in Antarctica.

Features
Geographical features include:

 Clark Ridge
 King Ridge
 Mount Cross
 Mount Lowry
 Mount Bruns
 Mount Murch
 Mount Stroschein
 Mount Suydam
 Mount Whillans
 Mount Woods
 MacNamara Glacier
 Weber Ridge
 Wrigley Bluffs

References
 

Hills of Queen Elizabeth Land
Pensacola Mountains